Scoloderus is a genus of orb-weaver spiders first described by Eugène Simon in 1887. They primarily feed on nocturnal moths using a ladder-type nest, featuring vertical extensions of sticky orbs above and below the circumference of the primary orb. When a moth strikes the web, it slides down the ladder, leaving behind scales on the sticky silk until it is completely ensnared.

Species
 it contains five species:
Scoloderus ackerlyi Traw, 1996 – Belize
Scoloderus cordatus (Taczanowski, 1879) (type) – Mexico to Argentina
Scoloderus gibber (O. Pickard-Cambridge, 1898) – Mexico to Argentina
Scoloderus nigriceps (O. Pickard-Cambridge, 1895) – USA, Mexico, Bahama Is., Cuba, Jamaica
Scoloderus tuberculifer (O. Pickard-Cambridge, 1889) – USA to Argentina

References

External links
Scoloderus at BugGuide

Araneidae
Araneomorphae genera
Spiders of North America
Spiders of South America
Taxa named by Eugène Simon